Sonoma County Transit is a public transportation system based in Sonoma County, California.

Cities and communities served
As the primary bus system in the county, Sonoma County Transit (SCT) operates to the following communities, listed by zone:

Zone 1 
Zone 2 
Zone 3 
Zone 4 
Zone 5 
Zone 6 
Zone 7 
Zone 8 
Notes:
 Some communities are in more than one zone, in which case they are included with the zone within which they have the most stops.
 Communities with seasonal, suspended, or discontinued service are in italics
 SCT has also operated an inter-county route to San Rafael in Marin County, providing connections to Golden Gate Transit, and Marin Transit, but service was suspended in early 2020 and its Route, 38, was taken off the map later that year.

Routes
SCT operates a number of routes as either local (within one city or area) or inter-community routes (using fare zones). A place indicated in italics means that the area is not served by all trips of a route. In 2023, service will be reduced or not provided on the following holidays as indicated:

 New Year's Day (January 1) no service
 Martin Luther King Jr. Day (January 16) Saturday service
 Presidents' Day (February 20) Saturday service
 Easter Sunday (April 9) no service
 Memorial Day (May 29) no service
 Independence Day (July 4) no service
 Labor Day (September 4) no service
 Thanksgiving Day (November 23) no service
 Black Friday (November 24) Saturday service
 Christmas Eve (December 24) Sunday service
 Christmas Day (December 25) no service
 New Year's Eve (December 31) Sunday service

Notes:
 Schedules are current .  Route numbers with a * are current .
 Routes indicated with a sky blue background serve the Santa Rosa Transit Mall.
 Routes indicated with a lime background will not charge a fare until at least July 2023.
 Routes indicated with a gold background will be fare free indefinitely.

Notes:
 Routes that have no lower supplemental text (Routes 20, 30, 44, 48, and 60) operate daily (except on major holidays, see above table).

Commuter Services

Fares, passes, and transfers
SCT fares vary according to the length of a patron's trip. The transit system is divided into fare zones, wherein the fare depends upon the number of zones traveled. Kids below 6 ride for free with fare-paying rider; 3-kid limit applies.

Notes:
 Although the MonthlyPASS and the 31-DayPASS are valid for one month, there are certain differences between the two.
 The MonthlyPASS is an unlimited-ride pass good for the calendar month for which it is issued. The MonthlyPASS is nontransferable, and it is to be used only by the person for whom it was purchased.
 The 31-DayPASS is valid for 31 days from the date of first use, and it can be purchased through various sales outlets, online, in person, or at the SCT main office in Santa Rosa.
 The 20-Ride CountywidePASS is a convenient 20-ride pass that eliminates the need to have the exact change for bus fare. The FastPASS is not discounted, however; it has the same value as paying cash fare. There is no expiration date for this PASS, and it is good on any Sonoma County Transit route for the number of zones purchased.
 During the summer, SCT offers a Cruisin' Pass that allows unlimited rides to patrons 19 years old and younger.

Transfers
SCT provides free transfers to passengers after paying a certain fare for the number of zones intended to travel, and it is valid for two (2) hours heading to the general direction of travel. Transferring from Santa Rosa CityBus, Petaluma Transit, and Golden Gate Transit are accepted for a first (boarding) zone fare credit. SCT also has transfer agreements with Healdsburg Transit aside from the three transit agencies mentioned above.

Paratransit
Sonoma County Paratransit is designed to serve the needs of individuals with disabilities within Sonoma County. It adheres to ADA standards to serve areas within 3/4 of a mile from any public fixed-route service. This includes service within the incorporated areas of Sonoma County, the Greater Santa Rosa Area, and between the County's nine incorporated cities. In addition, service is provided within the following communities: Windsor, Sebastopol, Sonoma, Sonoma Valley (including Agua Caliente and Boyes Hot Springs), Cotati, Rohnert Park, Rio Nido, Guerneville, Monte Rio, Duncans Mills, and Occidental.

Operating hours for the paratransit service are weekdays from 5:00am to 11:00pm and weekends from 7:00am to 9:00pm.

References

External links
Official website

See also
 Golden Gate Transit
 Santa Rosa CityBus
 Petaluma Transit
 Healdsburg Transit
 Metropolitan Transportation Commission

Bus transportation in California
Public transportation in Marin County, California
Public transportation in Sonoma County, California
Transportation in Santa Rosa, California
1980 establishments in California